The Chesterfield Kings were a rock band from Rochester, New York, who began as a retro-1960s garage band, and who have heavily mined 1960s music, including some borrowing from the 1960s recordings of The Rolling Stones. Core members were former Distorted Level singer, underground music journalist and avid record collector Greg Prevost (founder of the band), and Andy Babiuk (16 years old at the time of joining the band); others have come and gone. The band, named after a defunct brand of unfiltered cigarette, was instrumental in sparking the 1980s garage band revival that launched such groups as the Unclaimed, Marshmallow Overcoat, The Fuzztones, The Pandoras, The Malarians, Mystic Eyes, The Cynics, The Optic Nerve, the Secret Service, and the Stomachmouths.

History

The early Kings were a late-1970s recreation of a mid-1960s garage band sound. Their self-released first single (Living Eye Records, LSD-1) was a cover of The Brogues' 1965 "I Ain't No Miracle Worker" b/w The Heard's 1967 "Exit 9". In a deliberate effort to create their own rare garage-band collectible singles, only 100 copies were pressed.

Their first broader public exposure came when a track on Greg Shaw's 1981 Bomp! Records compilation Battle of the Garage netted them a series of dates at the Peppermint Lounge in New York City. They continued with this 1960s garage sound through the mid-1980s, releasing two albums—Here are the Chesterfield Kings (1982) which contained entirely cover songs, and Stop! (1985) which introduced their first originals. They then turned to a harder-edged rock sound for Don't Open Till Doomsday (1987) and Berlin Wall of Sound (1989) featuring the blues guitar work of new band member Paul Rocco. The group's next album was an acoustic blues record Drunk On Muddy Water (1990).

Their Let's Go Get Stoned (1994) was a mix of slightly post-Aftermath Stones covers and originals in the Stones' style. Surfin' Rampage (1997) featured pop harmonies; Where the Action Is (1999) was a return to garage band roots, a mix of covers and 1960s-styled originals.

The Mindbending Sounds of the Chesterfield Kings (2003) pays tribute to the more baroque side of the 1960s underground, evoking at times the sound of the Electric Prunes ("Transparent Life", "Disconnection"), and featuring appearances by Jorma Kaukonen on two tracks. In 2004 the band briefly appeared performing two songs from the album, "I Don't Understand" and "Mystery Trip", on stage in a rock club scene in the fifth season episode of HBO's The Sopranos, "Irregular Around the Margins". 

Their Psychedelic Sunrise (2008) was an extension of sorts of the group's previous album. Got Live…If You Want It (2009) was a dual live recording and DVD set, as well as the group's final release.

The Kings' full-length feature film Where is the Chesterfield King? (2000) is described on their web site as "A comedy/drama in the vein of The Bowery Boys, Batman, The Monkees Show, A Hard Day's Night, Hawaiian Eye, and The Munsters, with a little Three Stooges slapstick to boot…"

In 2011, Prevost took the solo route releasing a 45 "Mr. Charlie" b/w "Rolling Stone Blues" (Mean Disposition Records MDR45001) in 2012, and in 2013 releasing the blues-rock album Mississippi Murderer (Mean Disposition Records MDLP 001-vinyl & CD format). Mean Disposition is a division of Penniman Records out of Barcelona, Spain.

Line up
Greg Prevost (lead vocals, multi-instrumentalist 1976-2009)
Andy Babiuk (bass, multi-instrumentalist 1979–2009)
Orest Guran (organ, guitar, 1979–1986)
Richard Cona (lead guitar 1976–c.1987)
Doug Meech (drummer 1979–c.1988) (Deceased)
Walt O'Brien (guitar, organ, 1986–1987)
Paul Rocco (guitar 1990-1995) (Deceased)
Brett Reynolds (drums 1989-1994)
Kris Hadlock (drums 1994-1996)
Jeff Okolowicz (guitar 1995-1999, 2009-for the band's last show)
Ted Okolowicz (guitar 1995-1999)
Paul Morabito (guitar 1999-2009)
Mike Boise (drums, percussion 1996-2009)\
Zachary Koch (rhythm guitar 2007-2009)
Bob Ames (guitar 1977)
Steve Larreau (guitar 1977-1978)
Frank Moll (guitar 1978)

Partial discography

Albums
 (1982) Here are the Chesterfield Kings (Mirror Records MR-9, 14-song LP)
 (1985) Stop! (Mirror Records MR-10, 12-song LP; also remastered 14-song LP and cassette MR-10R)
 (1987) Don't Open Till Doomsday (Mirror Records MR-12, 14-song LP featuring Dee Dee Ramone, 15-song cassette)
 (1989) Berlin Wall of Sound (Mirror Records MR-15, 15-song CD/cassette, 14-song LP)
 (1990) Drunk On Muddy Water (Mirror Records MCD-16, 13-song limited edition CD)
 (1994) Let's Go Get Stoned (Mirror Records MR-19; several sources inaccurately give the title as Let's Get Stoned; 14-song LP, CD, and cassette).
 (1997) Surfin' Rampage (Mirror Records M-23, 32-song double LP and CD)
 (1999) Where the Action Is (Sundazed LSD 13, 17-song CD)
 (2003) The Mindbending Sounds of… (Living Eye / Sundazed, 2003; 14-song CD, 12 song LP - Wicked Cool Records, 2006; 14-song CD)
 (2008) Psychedelic Sunrise (12-song CD, 12-song LP - Wicked Cool Records, 2008)
(2009) Live Onstage...If You Want It (CD, DVD set- Wicked Cool Records, 2009)

Singles
 "I Ain't No Miracle Worker" b/w "Exit 9" (1979, Living Eye Records, LSD-1; limited edition 500 copies)
 "You Can't Catch Me" b/w "I Won't Be There" (1981, Living Eye Records, LSD-2; limited edition 50 copies)
 "Hey Little Bird" b/w "I Can Only Give You Everything" (1982, Living Eye Records, LSD-3)
 "I'm Going Home" b/w "A Dark Corner" (1982, Mirror Records)
 "She Told Me Lies" b/w "I've Got a Way With Girls" (1984, Mirror Records)
 "Baby Doll" b/w "I Cannot Find Her (acoustic version)" (1987, Mirror Records)
 "Next One In Line" b/w "Talk Talk" and "You Drive Me Nervous" (1991, Mirror Records, MIR45-4, 7-inch EP)
 "Hey Joe" b/w "Roadrunner" (as "The Paisley Zipper Band", 1994, Get Hip Recordings, GH-144)
 "Misty Lane" b/w "Little Girl" (1997, Misty Lane records, Italian fanzine release)
 "Wrong From Right" b/w "So What" (1998, Living Eye Records, LSD-5)
 "Run Rudolph Run" (1998, Living Eye Records, LSD-FC98, fan club Christmas single)
 "Help You Ann" b/w Lyres "She Told Me Lies" (1999, Living Eye Records, LSD-6; a split single, with each band covering a song originally by the other)
 "She Pays The Rent" b/w Lyres "She Told Me Lies" (2000, Feathered Apple Records, FA-1300; a split single, with each band covering a song originally by the other)
 "Where Do We Go From Here" b/w "Louie Go Home" (1999, Living Eye / Sundazed Records S-146; vocals by Mark Lindsay of Paul Revere and the Raiders)
 "Yes I Understand" b/w "Sometime At Night" (2001, Sundazed Records; vocals by Sal Valentino of The Beau Brummels)

Bootlegs
 Johnny Thunders and the Chesterfield Kings
 Fossils
 Kingsize Rock 'n' Roll
 Long Ago, Far Away (Paisley Zipper Band)

Notes and references

External links
 Where is the Chesterfield King? on Yahoo! Movies.
 The Chesterfield Kings at Rolling Stone
 Chesterfield Kings New Interview)
 YeboTV.com (The Chesterfield Kings Concert)
 YeboTV.com (The Chesterfield Kings Interview)
 Beatles Gear web site
 Greg Prevost web site

Musical groups from Rochester, New York
Rock music groups from New York (state)
Garage punk groups
Musical groups established in 1979